Sajószentpéter is a town in Borsod-Abaúj-Zemplén County, Northern Hungary. It lies in the Miskolc–Kazincbarcika agglomeration, 10 kilometres away from the county capital.

History
The town was mentioned first in 1281 as Szentpéter (St. Peter). It got the first part of its name later, from the river Sajó. The town was owned by the king, it belonged first to the Castle of Diósgyőr, then to the Dédes estate. During the Hussite fights the town was destroyed. It was built again after 1466 but got its town status back only in 1989.

In the 17th–18th century the town was owned by several important noble families, among them the Rákóczi and the Losonczy families.

In the 19th century the formerly agricultural village became an industrial one, coal mines were opened and a glass factory was built. Being halfway between two of the largest industrial cities of the area, Sajószentpéter couldn't avoid being more and more industrialized during the Socialist era, but, like in other cities and towns of Northern Hungary, the industry faced a crisis after the Socialist regime fall, and unemployment became one of the largest problems.

Sights
 Birthplace of József Lévay
 Country museum
 Gallery

Notable people
Sigismund Rákóczi (1544–1608), Prince of Transylvania (1607–1608)
Lea Gottlieb (1918–2012), Israeli fashion designer and founder of Gottex
János Koszta (born 1959), footballer
Oszkár Molnár (born 1956), politician
Anikó Nagy (born 1970), handball player 
Chaim Sofer (1821—1886), rabbi
István Varga (born 1956), politician and economist
Sándor Pécsi (1922–1972), actor

Twin towns – sister cities

Sajószentpéter is twinned with:
 Dobšiná, Slovakia
 Kobiór, Poland
 Šternberk, Czech Republic

References

External links

 in Hungarian

Populated places in Borsod-Abaúj-Zemplén County
Socialist planned cities
Planned cities in Hungary